is a Japanese mecha designer. Yamane began his career and honed his skills at noted studio Artmic in the 1980s, beginning with Bubblegum Crisis, A.D. Police: Dead End City, Gall Force and Megazone 23. After the studio was disbanded, he started his career as a freelancer and worked on numerous series as mecha designer, including The Vision of Escaflowne, Cowboy Bebop, Mobile Suit Gundam: The 08th MS Team and Mobile Fighter G Gundam. He worked for the first time with Shinichirō Watanabe on Cowboy Bebop. His work on non-robot productions such as The Silent Service, Gatchaman (OVA) and numerous Artmic works have also been lauded.

Yamane has also authored a book, Kimitoshi Yamane Mecha Zukan.

Filmography
Bubblegum Crisis (1987–1991)
Metal Skin Panic MADOX-01 (1988)
Hades Project Zeorymer (1988–1990)
Rhea Gall Force (1989)
The Three-Eyed One (1990–1991)
Bubblegum Crash (1991)
Detonator Orgun (1991-1993)
Gall Force: New Era (1991)
Casshan: Robot Hunter (1993–1994)
Gatchaman (1994–1995)
Mobile Fighter G Gundam (1994–1995)
The Vision of Escaflowne (1996)
Mobile Suit Gundam: The 08th MS Team (1996–1999)
Voogie's Angel (1997-1998)
Spriggan (1998)
Cowboy Bebop (1998–1999)
Infinite Ryvius (1999–2000)
Escaflowne (2000)
Argento Soma (2000–2001)
Cowboy Bebop: The Movie (2001)
Mobile Suit Gundam SEED (2002–2003)
Overman King Gainer (2002–2003)
Mobile Suit Gundam SEED Destiny (2004–2005)
Mobile Suit Gundam MS IGLOO (2004–2006)
Starship Operators (2005)
Tide-Line Blue (2005)
Cluster Edge (2005–2006)
Galaxy Angel II (2006)
Glass Fleet (2006)
Mobile Suit Gundam SEED C.E. 73: Stargazer (2006)
Kishin Taisen Gigantic Formula (2007)
Xam'd: Lost Memories (2008–2009)
Mobile Suit Gundam MS IGLOO 2 (2008–2009)
Five Numbers! (2011)
Eureka Seven: AO (2012)
Space Battleship Yamato 2199 (2013)
Gundam Reconguista in G (2014)

Sources:

References

External links 

1966 births
Mechanical designers (mecha)
Living people